ARA Rosales (P-42) is the second ship of the MEKO 140A16  of six corvettes built for the Argentine Navy. The ship is the fourth ship to bear the name of Colonel (Navy) Leonardo Rosales, who fought in the Argentine Navy during Argentina's war of independence and the Cisplatine War.

The Argentine Navy struggles to meet maintenance and training requirements because of financial problems and import restrictions. The availability of spare parts was a problem as of 2012 and by 2019 she was reported in reserve and to be scrapped. However, in 2021 she underwent repair work at the Tandanor shipyard and returned to service in 2022.

Origin

Rosales and her sister ships were part of the 1974 Naval Constructions National Plan, an initiative by the Argentine Navy to replace old World War II-vintage ships with more advanced warships. The original plan called for six MEKO 360H2 destroyers, four of them to be built in Argentina, but the plan was later modified to include four MEKO destroyers and six corvettes for anti-surface warfare and patrol operations.

Construction

Rosales was constructed at the Río Santiago Shipyard of the Astilleros y Fábricas Navales del Estado (State Shipyards and Naval Factories) state corporation.
Her keel was laid on 1 April 1981 and was launched on 4 March 1983. The ship was officially delivered to the Navy on 14 November 1986 and formally commissioned on 24 March 1987. First captain was Capitan de Navio Manuel Augusto Iricibar.

Service history

In February 1991, as part of Task Group 88.1 Rosales along with  participated as part of the Coalition of the Gulf War in the United Nations-mandated blockade of Iraq following its invasion of Kuwait. She participated in patrol and escort missions as part of Operations Desert Shield and Desert Storm, returning to Argentina on July 1991 

Rosales participated in several naval exercises and conducted fishery patrol duties in the Argentine exclusive economic zone, capturing two illegal fishing ships in 1992.

She is homeported at Puerto Belgrano Naval Base and is part of the 2nd Corvette Division with her five sister ships. In 2019, it was announced by the Argentine Navy that the vessel would be scrapped. However, one year later training activities were still being conducted on her. In 2021 it was reported that she was being repaired for a return to service. The maintenance work was completed at the Tandanor Shipyard and she was returned to service. 

References

Bibliography
 Guia de los buques de la Armada Argentina 2005-2006. Ignacio Amendolara Bourdette, Editor n/a. (Spanish/English text)

Espora-class corvettes
Ships built in Argentina
1983 ships
Corvettes of Argentina
Gulf War ships of Argentina